is the fifth  season of the JoJo's Bizarre Adventure anime television series by David Production, adapting Stone Ocean, the sixth part of Hirohiko Araki's JoJo's Bizarre Adventure manga. The first twelve episodes of Stone Ocean were initially released worldwide as part of an original net animation season on Netflix on December 1, 2021, before its scheduled airing on Japanese television in January 2022; the next twelve episodes released worldwide on September 1, 2022, and the final fourteen episodes were released on December 1 of the same year.

Plot
Set in 2011 in the United States, Jolyne Cujoh is sentenced to 15 years in prison after being involved in a car accident and framed for the vehicular manslaughter of a pedestrian. She is imprisoned at Green Dolphin Street Prison near Port St. Lucie, Florida, nicknamed the "Aquarium." Her father, Jotaro Kujo, gives her a pendant that causes a mysterious power to awaken inside of her. Following a series of inexplicable events, Jotaro informs his daughter that a disciple of Dio, named Pucci, framed her so that he could kill her in prison, and attempts to break her out. Following a confrontation against Pucci, Jotaro's memories and Stand are stolen, putting him in a medically unresponsive state. With Jolyne’s new resolve of wanting to save her father, she swears to find the culprit hiding within the prison. She then manages to escape and fights off three of Dio's sons on the way to Cape Canaveral. At Cape Canaveral, Pucci follows the instructions to achieve Heaven in Dio's diary and evolves his stand Whitesnake into C-Moon, with the ability to control gravity, and ultimately Made in Heaven, which accelerates time until the universe ends and gets recreated. He is then killed by Emporio, resulting in another universal reset, with only Emporio surviving and the rest of the cast reborn as alternate versions.

Cast

Production and release
The series was announced during a live-streamed event in April 2021. Like all previous parts, Stone Ocean is produced by Warner Bros. Japan and animated by David Production. The season ran for 38 episodes.

In August 2021, the first trailer was released during a Stone Ocean YouTube event, with a worldwide release on Netflix on December 1, 2021, with the first 12 episodes. In Japan, the series is also televised on Tokyo MX, BS11 and MBS starting a month later on January 8, 2022, with Animax following on January 22. Composer Yugo Kanno returned from previous seasons. Episodes 13–24 began streaming on Netflix worldwide on September 1, 2022; episodes 25–38 premiered on December 1 of the same year. With the exception of episode 38, the ending theme for the entire anime is "Distant Dreamer" by Duffy. Episode 38's ending theme is "Roundabout" by Yes, which was originally the ending theme for season 1.

Episode list

Home media release

Japanese

Reception
Stone Ocean's first twelve episodes premiered as the most watched title on Netflix among Japanese viewers, and the sixth most among American viewers.

Notes

References

External links
 
 

JoJo's Bizarre Adventure (Season 5)
2022 Japanese television seasons
Netflix original anime
Television series set in 2011
Television shows set in Florida